William Edward Barnett (26 October 1830 – 26 March 1869) was an English banker and cricketer. He played ten first-class matches for Cambridge University Cricket Club between 1849 and 1854.

The son of Robert Barnett of Blackheath, a stockbroker, he was educated at Eton College, and matriculated at Trinity College, Cambridge in 1848. He became a banker with Hodgkin, Barnett, Pease & Co. of Newcastle upon Tyne.

See also
 List of Cambridge University Cricket Club players

References

External links
 

1830 births
1869 deaths
English cricketers
Cambridge University cricketers
Sportspeople from Kent
Gentlemen of Kent cricketers
English bankers